The 2007 PTT Bangkok Open was a tennis tournament played on outdoor hard courts. It was the 3rd and final edition of the PTT Bangkok Open, and was a Tier III event on the 2007 Sony Ericsson WTA Tour. It was held in Bangkok, Thailand, from 8 October through 14 October 2009. Total prize money for the tournament was $200,000.

Finals

Singles 

 Flavia Pennetta defeated  Chan Yung-jan, 6–1, 6–3
Pennetta won her fourth WTA title of her career.

Doubles 

 Sun Tiantian /  Yan Zi defeated  Ayumi Morita /  Junri Namigata, Walkover

WTA entrants

Singles

Seeds 

 1 Seeds are based on the rankings of 8 October 2007.

Other entrants 
The following players received wildcards into the singles main draw:
  Sorana Cîrstea
  Noppawan Lertcheewakarn
  Urszula Radwańska

The following players received entry from the singles qualifying draw:
  Anne Kremer
  María Emilia Salerni
  Magdaléna Rybáriková
  Akgul Amanmuradova

Withdrawals
During the tournament
  Edina Gallovits (Heat illness)
  Jelena Janković (Heat illness)
  Vania King (Right lower back injury)
  Jelena Kostanić Tošić (Right thoracic spine injury)

Doubles

Seeds 

 1 Seeds are based on the rankings of 8 October 2007.

Other entrants 
The following players received wildcards into the doubles main draw:
  Sophia Mulsap &  Varatchaya Wongteanchai

The following players received an entry as alternates into the doubles main draw:
  Anne Kremer &  Aleksandra Wozniak

Withdrawals
Before the tournament
  Jill Craybas &  Jelena Kostanić Tošić (Kostanić Tošić withdrew with a right thoracic spine injury)

During the tournament
  Casey Dellacqua (Lumbar spine injury)
  Vania King (Right lower back injury)
  Ayumi Morita (Gastro-intestinal illness)

Prize money and points breakdown

Singles

Doubles

References

External links 
 Draws and tournament information